Abu Nageh (also Romanized as Abū Nāgeh, Aboo Nageh, and Abū Nāgah) is a village in Soveyseh Rural District, in the Soveyseh District of Karun County, Khuzestan Province, Iran. At the 2006 census, its population was 850, in 168 families. The village is the capital of Soveyseh Rural District besides being chosen as the capital of Soveyseh District when it was created on January 23, 2013.

References 

Populated places in Ahvaz County